The 1967 Toronto Argonauts finished in third place in the Eastern Conference with a 5–8–1 record. They appeared in the Eastern Semi-Final.

Regular season

Standings

Schedule

Postseason

References

Toronto Argonauts seasons
1967 Canadian Football League season by team
1967 in Toronto